The Small School was a coeducational private school for children ages 11–16, located in Hartland, Devon, England, that closed in 2016.

History
Satish Kumar, who also founded Resurgence magazine, lived in the rural village, and did not want to send his 10-year-old son to the nearest secondary school, either in Bude or Bideford. He decided to set up a school in the village. The Small School was founded in September 1982, and had a choice of afternoon options including: photography, yoga, pottery, woodwork. Unlike other state schools, the Small School was known for its pupils growing, cooking, and serving their own lunches. The Small School began with 8 children and grew to as many as 35.

On 20 May 2015 an Ofsted inspection found the school inadequate.  Two additional inspections were undertaken in 2016 and Ofsted shows that the School was closed later that year (https://reports.ofsted.gov.uk/provider/27/113611)

External links
 Archival Material at 
 Interview with Satish Kumar about the Small School, recorded in April 2010. Small Schools and Nurturing the Spirit in Education (audio, 41 minutes).

Defunct schools in Devon
Hartland, Devon
Educational institutions established in 1982
1982 establishments in England
Democratic free schools